Petrocosmea iodioides, called the violet petrocosmea, is a species of flowering plant in the family Gesneriaceae, native to southeast and south-central China. It has gained the Royal Horticultural Society's Award of Garden Merit.

References

iodioides
Endemic flora of China
Flora of South-Central China
Flora of Southeast China
Taxa named by William Hemsley (botanist)
Plants described in 1899